HMS Vivid  was a wooden paddle steamer of the Royal Navy, launched in 1848 for service as an Admiralty packet ship between Dover and Calais.

In 1889 Vivid became the Devonport flagship. The name Vivid was used for the newly established Devonport Royal Navy Barracks from 1890 onwards. The paddle steamer HMS Vivid was sold for breaking up to G. Cowen & Sons in May 1894.

References

1848 ships
Ships built in Chatham
Ships of the Royal Navy
Paddle steamers of the United Kingdom